is a Japanese novelist. Her novel Hebi ni piasu (Snakes and Earrings) won the Shōsetsu Subaru Literary Prize and the Akutagawa Prize, and sold over a million copies in Japan. Her work has been translated into more than a dozen languages worldwide.

Early life

Kanehara was born in Tokyo, Japan. During elementary school she spent a year in San Francisco with her father. At age 11, she dropped out of school, and at age 15 she left home. After leaving home, Kanehara pursued her passion for writing. Her father, Mizuhito Kanehara, a literary professor and translator of children's literature, continued to support her.

Career

Kanehara wrote her first novel, Hebi ni piasu (Snakes and Earrings), at the age of 21. The novel won the Shōsetsu Subaru Literary Prize and the Akutagawa Prize (judged by novelist Ryū Murakami), and became a Japanese bestseller, going on to sell more than one million copies. Kanehara and fellow 2003 Akutagawa Prize honoree Risa Wataya remain the youngest people ever to receive the Akutagawa Prize. In the same year that she won the Akutagawa Prize, Kanehara got married.

Kanehara's novel Autofiction, with a story that unfolds in reverse chronological order, was published in Japan in 2006. In 2007 an English version of Autofiction, translated by David James Karashima, was published by Vintage Books under the same name, and her novel Haidora (Hydra) appeared in print in Japan. A film adaptation of Hebi ni piasu, directed by Yukio Ninagawa and starring Yuriko Yoshitaka in the lead role, premiered in 2008. Kanehara's novel Torippu torappu (TRIP TRAP) was published in 2009, and won the 2010 Sakunosuke Oda Prize.

When the Fukushima Daiichi nuclear disaster occurred in 2011, Kanehara left Tokyo for Okayama out of concerns about the effects of radiation on her children. In 2012 she moved to France, and her book Mazāzu (Mothers) won the Bunkamura Deux Magots Literary Prize. While living in France with her husband and two daughters, Kanehara wrote several books, including Keihaku (Flirty) in 2016 and Kuraudo gāru (Cloud Girl) in 2017. After living in France for six years, in 2018 she and her family returned to Japan, where her essay collection Pari no Sabaku, Tōkyō no Shinkirō (Paris Desert, Tokyo Mirage), was published in 2020.

Writing style

Kanehara's early work is known for its graphic depictions of sexual activity, violence, body modification, pedophilia, anorexia, bulimia, and self-harm. Kanehara has claimed that her own experiences with self-harm have inspired her fictional settings and characters, and reviews of Hebi no piasu and Autofiction regularly focused on her own appearance and behavior. A common theme in her work is personal choice, with characters often making choices that place them outside societal norms in order to take control of their own actions and consequences. As Kanehara has explored this theme in her later work in the context of motherhood and family rather than youth and sex, media attention to her work has declined.

Recognition
 2003 Subaru Literary Prize (Shueisha) for Hebi ni piasu (Snakes and Earrings)
 2004 130th Akutagawa Prize (2003下) for Hebi ni piasu (Snakes and Earrings)
 2010 Sakunosuke Oda Prize for Torippu Torappu (Trip Trap)
 2012 Bunkamura Deux Magots Literary Prize for Mazāzu (Mothers)

Films and other adaptations

 Hebi ni piasu (Snakes and Earrings), 2008

Bibliography

Books in Japanese 
 Hebi ni piasu, Shueisha, 2004, 
 Ash Baby, Shueisha, 2004, 
 AMEBIC, Shueisha, 2005, 
 Autofiction. Shueisha, 2006, 
 Hydra, Shinchosha, 2007, 
 Hoshi e ochiru, Shueisha, 2007, 
 Torippu Torappu (Trip Trap), Kadokawa Shoten, 2009, 
 Yūutsutachi, Bungei Shunju, 2009, 
 Mazāzu (Mothers), Shinchosha, 2011, 
 Marriage Marriage, Shinchosha, 2012, 
 Motazaru mono (The Have-Nots), Shueisha, 2015, 
 Keihaku (Flirty), Shinchosha, 2016, 
 Kuraudo gāru (Cloud Girl), Asahi Shimbun, 2017,

Selected work in English 

 Snakes and Earrings, trans. David James Karashima, Dutton, 2005, 
 Autofiction, trans. David James Karashima, Vintage Books, 2007, 
 "Mambo", trans. Dan Bradley, The Book of Tokyo: A City in Short Fiction, 2015
 "Delira", trans. Dan Bradley, Granta, October 10, 2015
 "Aiguille" and "Pute", trans. Morgan Giles, Granta, November 11, 2020

References

External links 
 J'Lit | Authors : Hitomi Kanehara* | Books from Japan 

1983 births
Living people
21st-century Japanese novelists
Akutagawa Prize winners
Japanese women novelists
21st-century Japanese women writers